Ri Mu-yong is a North Korean politician and administrator. He served as Vice Premier and Minister of Chemical Industry in the Cabinet of North Korea.

Biography
He was born on April 8, 1948. During the 1990s to 2003 he served as director of the Namhung Youth Chemical Complex in Anju, South Pyongan Province. In 1998 he was elected to the 10th convocation of the Supreme People's Assembly (SPA), representing the 119th electoral district. In 2003 he was elected to the 11th convocation of the SPA, and appointed to Minister of Chemical Industry, replacing Pak Pong-ju who became Premier of North Korea. He served in that position until April 2017, when he was replaced by Jang Kil-ryong. During the 3rd Party Conference he was elected a full member of the Central Committee of the WPK. He was again elected also a full member of the 7th Central Committee following the 7th WPK Congress held in 2016. He was member of the funeral committee of Jo Myong-rok in 2010, Ri Ul-sol in 2015 and of Kim Yang-gon in 2015.

References

Members of the Supreme People's Assembly
Workers' Party of Korea politicians
Government ministers of North Korea
1948 births
Living people
People from South Pyongan
People from Nampo